Keurbosia is an enigmatic genus of Ordovician bilaterian of unknown affiliation from South Africa. The genus comprises a single species, Keurbosia susanae, which has yet to be formally described. It has been variously speculated to be related to arthropods or vertebrates.

Discovery 

The only two known specimens of Keurbosia susanae were discovered in 1998 in the Soom Shale of South Africa by a team from Leicester University. It hasn't been formally described yet, and remains a nomen nudum.

Description 

The animal was soft-bodied, and had around 45 segments.

Its well-preserved internal anatomy shows a structure that has been interpreted as a notochord, from which branched a thick musculature.

References 

Nomina nuda